Quantum is the third studio album by instrumental rock/progressive metal supergroup Planet X, released in 2007 through Inside Out Music. Guitarist Allan Holdsworth was originally slated to feature on most tracks, but ended up not finishing the project. As a result, his solos remain only on "Desert Girl" and "The Thinking Stone".

Critical reception

François Couture at AllMusic gave Quantum four stars out of five, calling it "a quantum leap above previous Planet X releases" and "a surprisingly mature album". He praised the album's stronger compositions and better diversity over previous Planet X material, and listed "Alien Hip Hop", "Matrix Gate", "Space Foam", "Kingdom of Dreams" and "Desert Girl" as highlights.

In a 2012 article by MusicRadar, Dream Theater drummer Mike Mangini ranked the album tenth in his list of most influential drum albums.

Track listing

Personnel

Brett Garsed – guitar, production
Allan Holdsworth – additional guitar solos (tracks 2, 4)
Derek Sherinian – keyboard, production
Virgil Donati – drums, orchestration, production
Jimmy Johnson – bass (except tracks 5, 9)
Rufus Philpot – bass (tracks 5, 9)
Matt Flinker – engineering
Jamie Black – engineering
Steve Scanlon – mixing (except track 9), mastering
Simon Phillips – mixing (track 9)

Release history

References

External links
MetalJazz spotlight: review of Planet X, "Quantum" (Inside Out) and interview with PX keyboardist Derek Sherinian. at MetalJazz

Planet X (band) albums
2007 albums
Inside Out Music albums